Lady M is a super-yacht launched on 13 May 2013 at the American Palmer Johnson shipyard in Sturgeon Bay, Wisconsin and delivered later that year. She was built as Project Stimulus. The interior and exterior design of Lady M were done by Nuvolari & Lenard. She is currently not for charter.

Design 

Both the materials of the hull and the superstructure are made out of Aluminium with teak laid decks. The yacht is Lloyd's registered, issued by Cayman Islands.

Engines 

History
Owned by Russian oligarch Alexey Mordashov, Lady M was seized by Italian police due to the EU's sanctions imposed on a number of Russian businessmen as a consequence of the 2022 Russian invasion of Ukraine.

See also
 Luxury yacht
 List of motor yachts by length
 List of yachts built by Palmer Johnson

References 

2013 ships
Motor yachts
Ships built in the United States
Ships built in Sturgeon Bay, Wisconsin